Jacques Boudet (born 29 December 1939) is a French stage and screen actor. He had great success in the 1980s with his appearance in Exercises in Style, and is featured in the film The Names of Love (2010).

In cinema, he frequently appeared in films by Robert Guédiguian. He excels in composite roles such as his Duc de Guermantes in Un amour de Swann, the brother of the character played by Philippe Noiret in Père et fils and the cynical politician with a southern French accent in L'Ivresse du pouvoir. He also appeared in the 1979 British TV play Churchill and the Generals as Charles de Gaulle.

Filmography

Theater

External links

Living people
French male stage actors
French male film actors
French male television actors
1939 births
20th-century French male actors
21st-century French male actors
Male actors from Paris